Beaver Creek Provincial Park is a Class C provincial park in the Regional District of Kootenay Boundary in British Columbia, Canada.

References

External links

Provincial parks of British Columbia
West Kootenay
Year of establishment missing